Light It Up is the seventh studio album by Australian country singer Casey Barnes, released on 25 February 2022 through Chugg Music. The album was announced on 10 November 2021 alongside a national tour that commenced on the album's day of release. It peaked at number 17 on the ARIA Albums Chart.
 
The album was preceded by lead single "Come Turn Me On", which spent five weeks at number one on The Music Network CountryTown Hot50 chart  and was the most played song on Australian country radio in 2021.
 
At the 2022 ARIA Music Awards, the album won ARIA Award for Best Country Album.
 
At the Country Music Awards of Australia of 2023, the album won Album of the Year and Top Selling Australian Country Album of the Year.

Reception
Zanda Wilson from The Music called the album "incredibly polished" and "undoubtedly one of Casey Barnes' most complete albums to date".

Track listing
All songs written by Casey, MSquared, Kaci Brown and Sam Gray.

 "Get to Know Ya" – 3:26
 "Kiss Me Like You Mean It" – 3:07
 "Small Town" – 3:42
 "Come Turn Me On" – 3:05
 "Light It Up" – 2:51
 "Up in Flames" – 3:34
 "God Took His Time On You" – 3:36
 "Love Fool" – 3:32
 "This Ain't the Encore" – 3:15
 "Gone Gone Gone" – 3:17

Charts

Weekly charts

Year-end charts

References

 

2022 albums
ARIA Award-winning albums
Casey Barnes albums